Statistics of Lao League in the 2012 season.

Clubs 
Eastern Star FC
Ezra FC
Lao Airlines FC
Lao-American College FC
Lao Army FC
Lao Lane Xang FC
Lao Police Club
Pheuanphatthana FC
Vientiane FC
Yotha FC (previously Ministry of Public Works and Transport FC)

League table

References 

Lao Premier League seasons
1
Laos
Laos